Suzanne Francis (March 20, 1959) is an English science fiction and fantasy author. She was born in King's Lynn, Norfolk, and now lives in Dunedin, New Zealand.  She has been married twice and has four children.

Suzanne Francis is the author of four published novels, collectively known as the Song of the Arkafina. The books were first published as ebooks by Mushroom Ebooks in 2007–2009 and in paperback in 2009 by Bladud Books.
 
All the books in the Song of the Arkafina are set in an imaginary universe known as the Gyre.  Ms. Francis has stated she intends to continue adding works to the Gyre Cosmos in the future.  She has also completed a series entitled Sons of the Mariner, which follows the further events in the lives of the main characters from the Song of the Arkafina series. It has, as yet, only been published in an electronic format.

Bibliography

Song of the Arkafina

 Heart of Hythea (2008)
 Ketha's Daughter (2009)
 Dawnmaid (2009)()
 Beyond the Gyre (2009)

Sons of the Mariner
 Wintermoon Ice (2010) (ASIN B004I1KNYK)
 Summermoon Fire (2011) (ASIN B004NSVQ94)

References

External links
Official site
Publisher's site
Live Interview with Suzanne Francis on Blog Talk Radio

1959 births
Living people
Writers from King's Lynn
English fantasy writers
Writers from Dunedin